The hanger reflex is a human reflex. When the head is circled with a tight-fitting and stretched clothes hanger, the hanger compresses the frontotemporal region and the head involuntarily rotates toward the direction of the hook. It is not clear what causes this action. 

It was first reported by J. E. Christensen, of the Institute of International Health, Immunology and Microbiology, University of Copenhagen, in Denmark, on 31 August 1991, in the scientific article "New treatment of spasmodic torticollis", in the medical journal The Lancet, in connection with treatment for spasmodic torticollis.

The phenomenon gained attention on social media in 2020 and again in 2022, becoming known as The Hanger Challenge, with people posting videos of the reflex in action.

References 

Reflexes